Casey Ross Cramer (born January 5, 1982) is a former American football fullback. He was drafted by the Tampa Bay Buccaneers in the seventh round of the 2004 NFL Draft. He played college football at Dartmouth.

Cramer has also been a member of the New York Jets, Tennessee Titans, Carolina Panthers and Miami Dolphins.

Early years
He went to high school at Middleton High School in Middleton, Wisconsin, where he is the son of an English teacher and school psychologist. He lettered in football, basketball and track for the Cardinals, and was one of the captains for varsity football team. He was the starting tight end and middle linebacker, and was the team's punter.

College career
Cramer played college football at Dartmouth College, where he majored in psychology, graduating in 2004. He was a brother at Gamma Delta Chi fraternity and participated in various community service organizations. He primarily played tight end and special teams at Dartmouth.  Cramer ranks second in Dartmouth history with 185 catches for 2,477 yards and 21 touchdowns as a tight end. Cramer appeared in 39 games with 33 starts and led all college tight ends with 72 receptions for 1,017 yards and seven touchdowns as junior in 2002.  He also posted 11 career games with 100 yards or more of receiving. He is Dartmouth's most recent All-American, making three different All-America first-teams in 2002 and also the Associated Press second-team that fall.

Professional career

Tampa Bay Buccaneers
Cramer was drafted in the seventh round (228 overall) of the 2004 NFL Draft by the Tampa Bay Buccaneers. Casey was later cut.

Carolina Panthers
Casey Cramer was signed to Carolina Panthers Practice Squad after the 2005 training camp.

Second stint with Titans
In the 2006 season Casey saw his most playing time in the NFL to date, even blocking a punt and recovering a fumble against the Washington Redskins.  Besides making the highlight reels, Peter King's Monday Morning Quarterback, and Chris Berman's plays of the week, Cramer also earned NFL special teams player of the week for his performance. On August 30, 2008, Cramer was released from the Titans during final cuts.

Miami Dolphins
Following Week 1 of the 2008 regular season, the Miami Dolphins released starting fullback Boomer Grigsby. Cramer was signed to replace him on the roster on September 9. In nine games with the Dolphins including two starts, Cramer caught two passes for three yards and a touchdown. The Dolphins waived Cramer on December 20 when they promoted linebacker William Kershaw from the practice squad.

Third stint with Titans
Cramer was re-signed by the Tennessee Titans on December 31, 2008 after linebacker Josh Stamer was placed on injured reserve. He was waived on September 4.

References

1982 births
Living people
Sportspeople from Madison, Wisconsin
Players of American football from Wisconsin
American football tight ends
American football fullbacks
Dartmouth Big Green football players
Tampa Bay Buccaneers players
New York Jets players
Tennessee Titans players
Carolina Panthers players
Miami Dolphins players
People from Middleton, Wisconsin